Miss Colombia 1992 was the 44th edition of the Miss Colombia pageant. According to tradition, it was celebrated in Cartagena de Indias, within the framework of the Independence of Cartagena on November 16, 1992.

At the end of the event, Paula Andrea Betancur of Amazonas was crowned by Paola Turbay of Bogota at the event's conclusion. This is the first and so far only time that Amazonas won the pageant.

Results

Contestants
28 candidates were selected to compete in this edition.

References

Miss Colombia
Beauty pageants